Thrissur State assembly constituency is one of the 140 state legislative assembly constituencies in Kerala. It is also one of the 7 state legislative assembly constituencies included in the Thrissur Lok Sabha constituency. As of the 2021 assembly elections, the current MLA is P. Balachandran of CPI.

Local self-governed segments
Thrissur Niyama Sabha constituency is composed of the following 41 wards of the Thrissur Municipal Corporation:

Members of Legislative Assembly 
The following list contains all members of Kerala legislative assembly who have represented the constituency:

Key

      

* Bypoll

Election results

Niyamasabha Election 2021

Niyamasabha Election 2016 
There were 1,72,358 registered voters in the constituency for the 2016 election.

Niyamasabha Election 2011
There were 1,61,886 registered voters in the constituency for the 2011 election.

See also
 Thrissur
 Thrissur district
 List of constituencies of the Kerala Legislative Assembly
 2016 Kerala Legislative Assembly election

References

State assembly constituencies in Thrissur district
Assembly constituencies of Kerala